Ivor Verdun Powell, MBE (5 July 1916 – 6 November 2012) was a Welsh football player and manager. He won eight caps for Wales.

A wing half, he began his professional career with Queens Park Rangers in September 1937. His career was interrupted by World War II, though he returned to QPR to help them to the Third Division South title in 1947–48. He moved to Aston Villa for £17,500 in December 1948, and played 79 games in the First Division. He was appointed player-manager at Port Vale in July 1951, though was sacked after just four months. He was appointed Bradford City manager in 1952, but was again unsuccessful, and departed in February 1955. He did find success at Carlisle United following his appointment in 1960, leading the club to promotion out of the Fourth Division in 1961–62. He left the club in 1963, and later managed Bath City, before becoming a coach.

He was inducted to the Welsh Sports Hall of Fame in 2004 alongside snooker player Terry Griffiths and cricketer Tony Lewis. He also entered the Guinness Book of World Records as the oldest working football coach on his 90th birthday after 55 years as a coach. He retired on 26 May 2010, aged 93. Ivor was the father of Barry Powell.

Playing career

Club career
Powell started his working life down the mines, alongside his father and six brothers. His playing career began with South Wales League side Bargoed Thursdays. In August 1936 he was invited to London to have a trial with Queens Park Rangers. This was unsuccessful but Powell stayed in London and got a job. He started playing for the reserve team of Barnet and in May 1937 played in a friendly game against QPR. Powell was the outstanding player in the game, which Barnet won 8–1, and this time Rangers took real interest. Joining QPR on professional terms under Billy Birrell in September 1937, the club finished third in the Third Division South, missing out on promotion as they finished three points below champions Millwall. They finished sixth in 1938–39, the first full season before the outbreak of World War II. 

During the war he guested for Bradford City and Blackpool whilst working as an RAF physical trainer. It was at Blackpool that he struck up a friendship with Stanley Matthews, who later became Powell's best man at his wedding to Joan Browell in 1943.

He returned to Loftus Road after the war, and helped QPR to finish as the Third Division South runners-up in 1946–47, though only the team that finished first were promoted into the Second Division. They managed to finish as champions in 1947–48 under Dave Mangnall's stewardship, to finally win promotion. He played a total of 159 league and cup games for the club.

On 15 December 1948, the tough tackler commanded a £17,500 transfer fee; this was a record for a half back and for both the buying and selling clubs when he moved to Alex Massie's Aston Villa. He played another 79 First Division games for Villa in 1948–49, 1949–50, and 1950–51, before he was appointed player-manager at Port Vale in July 1951.

International career
Powell made eight international caps for Wales and won four wartime caps. In one game he was replaced by Englishman Stan Mortensen in a game between England and Wales when his injury left the Welsh side without an available substitute.

Management career
At Port Vale as player-manager he played just the six times, restricted on the field by a knee injury. As a manager, he tried to 'rule by fear' and was not well liked by the players; with the club bottom of the Third Division South, his contract was terminated in November 1951. Roy Sproson later said that "everything seemed to go wrong for him at Vale" and that "he used to treat players like kids".

He moved to Barry Town before being appointed the new Bradford City manager, again as player-manager, before the start of the 1952–53 season. His first season at Valley Parade was disappointing as they slipped to 16th in Third Division North. The following season they came fifth but were 16 points shy of the promotion places. During that season he missed the first penalty of his career in a home fixture with Workington. The following season, he was carried off with knee ligament damage against Wrexham. The injury ended his playing career. City's form also struggled and Powell left in February 1955 after a run of seven straight defeats and just two wins from 19 games without his presence on the field. City were forced to apply for re-election at the end of the campaign.

Powell became a trainer-coach at Don Revie's Leeds United, and also had a coaching spell at PAOK in Greece, before he returned to management with Carlisle United in May 1960, succeeding Andy Beattie. He led the "Cumbrians" to their first promotion when they finished fourth in the Fourth Division in 1961–62. He instilled discipline at Brunton Park, and signed players such as Peter McConnell, Reg Davies, Terry Caldwell, and Jack Marsden. He left the following season, with the club struggling in the league and knocked out of the FA Cup by Southern League side Gravesend & Northfleet.

He became manager of Bath City in 1964 and then a member of the coaching staff at Team Bath (University of Bath), where he worked for over 30 years, before becoming a coach at the same club. At the age of 93, Powell announced his retirement as the "world's oldest football coach" in May 2010.

Legacy
He was inducted to the Welsh Sports Hall of Fame in 2004. In 2006, while assistant coach for Team Bath at the University of Bath, he celebrated his 90th birthday and entered the Guinness Book of World Records as the oldest working football coach. He later became the club President. He completed 53 years as an FA accredited coach. In 1993, he was awarded an Honorary Degree (MA) by the University of Bath.

He was appointed a Member of the Order of the British Empire (MBE) in the 2008 New Year Honours for his services to sport and was presented with his award by Queen Elizabeth II on 25 June 2008, a few days short of his 92nd birthday. He described receiving the award as "an honour and a privilege."

In 2010, he launched "The Ivor Powell Sports Scholarship Fund" at the University of Bath to provide scholarships for future undergraduates who are gifted both academically and in their chosen sport. This scholarship is administered by University of Bath Development and Alumni Relations.

Career statistics

Playing statistics
Source:

A.  The "Other" column constitutes appearances and goals in the League Cup, Football League Trophy, Football League play-offs and Full Members Cup.

International statistics

Managerial statistics

Honours

As a player
Queens Park Rangers
Football League Third Division South: 1947–48

As a manager
Carlisle United
Football League Fourth Division fourth-place promotion: 1961–62

References

People from Bargoed
Sportspeople from Caerphilly County Borough
Welsh footballers
Wales international footballers
Association football wing halves
Barnet F.C. players
Queens Park Rangers F.C. players
Aston Villa F.C. players
Bradford City A.F.C. wartime guest players
Blackpool F.C. wartime guest players
Port Vale F.C. players
Barry Town United F.C. players
Bradford City A.F.C. players
English Football League players
Association football coaches
Association football player-managers
Welsh football managers
Port Vale F.C. managers
Bradford City A.F.C. managers
Carlisle United F.C. managers
Bath City F.C. managers
TeamBath coaches
British expatriates in Greece
PAOK FC managers
English Football League managers
Members of the Order of the British Empire
Royal Air Force personnel of World War II
Royal Air Force Physical Training instructors
1916 births
2012 deaths